Kevin George Jacobsen OAM (born July 29,1939 in Sydney) is an Australian entertainment entrepreneur and former musician who is the head of the Jacobson Entertainment Group

Along with brothers, Col Joye and Keith, he was a member of the Australian 1960s band Col Joye and The Joyboys which achieved four #1 Top Forty chart hits.

Roster of Artists
 The Jacobsen Group of Companies has :presented many international artists including:

Production

Kevin has also produced theatrical shows such as Disney's Beauty and the Beast, Camelot with Richard Harris, Fame, A Chorus Line, and Dirty Dancing – The Classic Story on Stage. 

He was also the Executive Producer of the musical theatre production The Man from Snowy River: Arena Spectacular.

Honours
Jacobsen was awarded the Medal of the Order of Australia (OAM) in 1985 for his services to the performing arts and entertainment industry.

Helpmann Awards
The Helpmann Awards is an awards show, celebrating live entertainment and performing arts in Australia, presented by industry group Live Performance Australia (LPA) since 2001. In 2002, Jacobsen received the JC Williamson Award, the LPA's highest honour, for their life's work in live performance.

|-
| 2002
 || Himself || JC Williamson Award || 
|-

References

Further reading
 Ian McFarlane (1999) The Encyclopedia of Australian Rock and Pop, Allen and Unwin
 Max Moore (2003) Some Days are Diamonds, New Holland Publishers

External links
 
 The Man from Snowy River: Arena Spectacular at IMDb
 Frank Van Straten (2007) Profile, Hall of Fame, Live Performance Australia
 Valerie Lawson (2009) Jacobsens' Dirty Dancing family feud on show, 9 May 2009, The Australian

1939 births
Living people
Recipients of the Medal of the Order of Australia
Helpmann Award winners
Australian theatre managers and producers